Esam is a given name. Notable people with the name include:

Esam Al-Kandari (born 1971), Kuwaiti footballer
Esam Omeish (born 1967), Libyan-born American physician
Esam Sakeen (born 1971), Kuwaiti footballer

See also
Sam (given name)